Michael George Glen Waltz (born January 31, 1974) is an American politician and United States Army officer serving as the U.S. representative for Florida's 6th congressional district. A member of the Republican Party, he was first elected in 2018 and succeeded Ron DeSantis, who went on to be elected the 46th governor of Florida in 2018.

Early life and education
Waltz was born in Boynton Beach, Florida, and grew up in Jacksonville. He earned a Bachelor of Arts degree in international studies from the Virginia Military Institute and was commissioned as a Second Lieutenant in the U.S. Army.

Career

Waltz represents Florida's 6th congressional district, which is on the eastern Florida coast and stretches from Jacksonville's southern suburbs to New Smyrna Beach. It includes the city of Daytona Beach. Waltz is a combat-decorated Green Beret still serving as a colonel in the U.S. Army National Guard, and a former White House and Pentagon policy advisor. He is the first Green Beret to be elected to Congress.
 
Waltz graduated with honors as a Distinguished Military Graduate from the Virginia Military Institute, and has served over 26 years in the Army. After commissioning as an Army lieutenant, he graduated Ranger School and was selected to be a Green Beret, serving worldwide as a Special Forces officer with multiple tours in Afghanistan, the Middle East and Africa. For his actions in combat, Waltz was decorated with four Bronze Stars, including two for valor.

Waltz worked in the Pentagon as a defense policy director for Secretaries of Defense Donald Rumsfeld and Robert Gates. He went on to serve in the White House as the vice president's counterterrorism advisor. Waltz wrote "Warrior Diplomat: A Green Beret’s Battles from Washington to Afghanistan."

In 2010, Waltz helped found the analytics and training company Metis Solutions. It was bought in November 2020 by Pacific Architects and Engineers for $92 million.

Political positions

War in Afghanistan 
After telling an anecdote to the 2017 Conservative Political Action Conference audience about his time serving in Afghanistan during the public announcement of the Obama-era troop withdrawals, Waltz said of the War in Afghanistan, "So, are we 15 years in? Yes. Are we in for a lot more fighting and do we need a long-term strategy to undermine the ideology of Islamic extremism—just like we did fascism and just like we did communism? Yes, we do. Uh, and you know, I think we're in for a long haul and I think our nation's leadership needs to begin telling the American people, 'I'm sorry, we don't have a choice, we're 15 years in to what is going to be a multi-generational war because we're talking about defeating an idea.' It's easy to bomb a tank, very difficult to defeat an idea and that's exactly what we have to do." After his statement, a CPAC audience member disrupted the panel, shouting "It's impossible".

China 

Waltz is considered one of Congress's most hawkish members with regard to China, saying, "We are in a Cold War with the Chinese Communist Party." In 2021, he was the first member of Congress to call for a full U.S. boycott of the 2022 Winter Olympics over the CCP’s genocide and internment of Chinese Uyghur populations and the enslavement, forced labor, and concentration camp of ethnic minorities in China.

Waltz serves on the House China Task Force with 15 Republican lawmakers representing 14 committees of jurisdiction to coordinate policy on China. The Task Force collaborated and released the China Task Force report. The CTF issued a final report that includes 82 key findings and more than 400 forward-leaning recommendations to addressing the China threat.

In the 116th Congress, Waltz sponsored the American Critical Mineral Exploration and Innovation Act of 2020 to reduce America’s dependence on foreign sources of critical minerals and bringing the U.S. supply chain from China back to America by establishing a critical mineral research and development program at the Department of Energy, which was signed into law in Section 7002 of Division Z in the FY21 appropriations bill.
 
Waltz has also pioneered legislation to secure American universities and academies from Chinese espionage. In 2020, he secured legislation that provides a universal requirement, for all agencies, for researchers to disclosure all foreign funding sources in applications for federal funding. Failure would result in permanent termination of research and developments awards to the professor or school, permanent debarment of malign professors, and criminal charges.

Further, Waltz directed the Department of Defense to track foreign talent recruitment programs that pose a threat to the United States, particularly as a response to China Communist Party efforts to infiltrate American universities.

Waltz also sponsored legislation to ensure the Federal Thrift Savings Plan (TSP) does not invest in Chinese or Russian markets. Weeks later, President Trump directed the Federal Retirement Thrift Investment Board to reverse their decision to expand TSP investments.

In December 2022, Waltz warned that the U.S. could lose its strategic advantage over China in the Indian Ocean.

U.S. House of Representatives

Elections

2018 

Waltz ran for Florida's 6th congressional district in 2018 to succeed incumbent Republican Ron DeSantis, who retired before being elected governor of Florida. He defeated John Ward and Fred Costello in the Republican primary before facing Democratic nominee Nancy Soderberg, a former representative at the United Nations and the former Deputy National Security Advisor, in the general election. Waltz won with 56.31% of the vote to Soderberg's 43.69%.

2020 

Waltz was challenged by Democratic nominee Clint Curtis. He received 265,393 votes (60.64%) to Curtis's 172,305 (39.36%).

Tenure
Waltz was sworn in to the 116th United States Congress on January 3, 2019.

In April 2020, Waltz joined the National Guard's COVID-19 response efforts as a colonel on the planning staff. On November 6, 2020, during the COVID-19 pandemic, he tested positive for the virus.

In December 2020, Waltz was one of 126 Republican members of the House of Representatives to sign an amicus brief in support of Texas v. Pennsylvania, a lawsuit filed at the United States Supreme Court contesting the results of the 2020 presidential election, in which Joe Biden defeated incumbent Donald Trump. The Supreme Court declined to hear the case on the basis that Texas lacked standing under Article III of the Constitution to challenge the results of an election held by another state.  Shortly thereafter, the Orlando Sentinel editorial board rescinded its endorsement of Waltz in the 2020 election. It wrote, "We had no idea, had no way of knowing at the time, that Waltz was not committed to democracy."

Along with all other Senate and House Republicans, Waltz voted against the American Rescue Plan Act of 2021.

On May 19, 2021, Waltz voted against legislation to establish the formation of a January 6 commission meant to investigate the storming of the U.S. Capitol.

Foreign policy
In 2020, Waltz voted for the National Defense Authorization Act of 2021, which would prevent the president from withdrawing soldiers from Afghanistan without congressional approval.

In August 2021, Waltz called on President Biden to reverse course on the War in Afghanistan. In 2010, Waltz helped found Metis Solutions, a defense contractor that "provides strategic analysis, intelligence support, and training", with offices in Arlington, Virginia; Tampa, Florida; Abu Dhabi, United Arab Emirates; and Kabul, Afghanistan. Waltz sold Metis Solutions in 2020.

Draft
Waltz voted to include provisions for drafting women in the National Defense Authorization Act of 2022.

Immigration
Waltz voted for the Consolidated Appropriations Act (H.R. 1158), which effectively prohibits Immigration and Customs Enforcement from cooperating with the Department of Health and Human Services to detain or remove illegal alien sponsors of Unaccompanied Alien Children.

LGBT rights
On July 19, 2022, Waltz and 46 other Republican Representatives voted for the Respect for Marriage Act, which would codify the right to same-sex marriage in federal law.

Committee assignments 
Committee on Armed Services
Subcommittee on Readiness (Chairman)
Subcommittee on Intelligence, Emerging Threats and Capabilities
Subcommittee on Strategic Forces
House Permanent Select Committee on Intelligence
Subcommittee on Central Intelligence Agency
Subcommittee on National Security Agency & Cyber
Committee on Foreign Affairs
Subcommittee on Asia, the Pacific, Central Asia and Nonproliferation
Subcommittee on Oversight and Accountability

Caucus memberships 
Waltz is a member of the following Congressional caucuses.
Congressional Afghan Caucus
American Flood Coalition
Army Caucus
Florida Ports Caucus
For Country Caucus (vice chair and co-founder)
Kurdish American Caucus
Congressional Automotive Performance and Motorsports Caucus
Republican Study Committee
 House Special Operations Forces (SOF) Caucus (co-chair)
Congressional Shipbuilding Caucus
Congressional Singapore Caucus
Congressional Taiwan Caucus
Republican Main Street Partnership
Women, Peace and Security (WPS) Caucus

Electoral history

Personal life
Waltz has a teenage daughter and is married to Julia Nesheiwat, a combat veteran who served in the Bush, Obama, and Trump administrations, most recently as Trump's Homeland Security Advisor. Waltz and Nesheiwat also have a child together. They live in St. Johns County.

Books
 Warrior Diplomat: A Green Beret's Battles from Washington to Afghanistan. .
 Dawn of the BRAVE: Saga 1 - Book 9. . |url=https://bravebooks.us/products/dawn-of-the-brave-saga-1-book-9

References

External links

 Congressman Michael Waltz official U.S. House website
Michael Waltz for Congress

|-

1974 births
United States Army personnel of the War in Afghanistan (2001–2021)
George W. Bush administration personnel
Living people
Members of the United States Army Special Forces
21st-century American politicians
Republican Party members of the United States House of Representatives from Florida
United States Army officers
Virginia Military Institute alumni